AEW Grand Slam is an annual professional wrestling television special produced by the American promotion All Elite Wrestling (AEW). Established in 2021, the event airs in two parts, first as a special episode of the promotion's flagship weekly television program, Wednesday Night Dynamite, then as a special episode of their secondary weekly program, Friday Night Rampage. The show is distributed by Warner Bros. Discovery, which AEW's broadcast partners, TBS and TNT, are also part of. The event is held annually at the Arthur Ashe Stadium in Queens, New York in late September. The inaugural event was AEW's first event to take place entirely within a stadium, as well as the promotion's first event held in New York City.

History
Due to the COVID-19 pandemic that began affecting the industry in mid-March 2020, All Elite Wrestling (AEW) held the majority of their programs from Daily's Place in Jacksonville, Florida; these events were originally held without fans, but the company began running shows at 10–15% capacity in August, before eventually running full capacity shows in May 2021. In June, AEW announced that they would be returning to live touring, beginning with an special episode of Dynamite titled Road Rager on July 7. Shortly after, AEW announced that their September 22 episode would be another special episode of Dynamite titled Grand Slam. The event was scheduled to be held in the New York City borough of Queens, New York at the Arthur Ashe Stadium. Grand Slam marked AEW's first event held in New York City, which is primarily known as home territory for WWE, as well as their first full event to be held in a stadium.

During the September 15 episode of Dynamite, AEW announced that Grand Slam was expanded to a two-part event. The second Grand Slam show was announced to air on tape delay as the September 24 episode of Rampage, which also aired for two hours instead of its usual one-hour. Additionally, three dark matches were taped to be shown on the September 27 episode of AEW's YouTube show, Elevation.

On May 11, 2022, AEW president Tony Khan confirmed that Grand Slam would return to the Arthur Ashe Stadium later that year and the event would continue forward as an annual event at the same venue. During the AEW x NJPW: Forbidden Door pay-per-view on June 26, the 2022 Grand Slam's date was confirmed for September 21, with Dynamite airing live that night and Rampage airing on tape delay on September 23.

Events 
Each Grand Slam event is held at the Arthur Ashe Stadium in Queens, New York.

See also
List of All Elite Wrestling special events
List of AEW Dynamite special episodes

References

External links

Recurring events established in 2021